Micropenaeus is an extinct genus of prawns in the order Decapoda. It was first named in 1998 by Sergio Bravi and Alessandro Garassino.

References

Penaeidae
Early Cretaceous crustaceans
Fossils of Italy
Cretaceous Italy
Early Cretaceous arthropods of Europe
Albian genera